Comhairle na nÓg (English: youth council) are councils for the youth located in 31 locations in the Republic of Ireland, which gives the youth in Ireland the opportunity to be involved in the progress of local services and policies. Comhairle na nÓg is for young people aged between 12 and 18 in secondary level education and allows them to have a voice on the issues, policies and services that affect them in their local areas, since they have no other voting mechanism to have their voice heard.

It provides a setting for young people to talk about national and local problems which matter to them.

Comhairle na nÓg is recognised as the official structures by the Irish Government for young people to participate in the development of policies and services. This ensures that the youth are included in shaping policies and services.

History

Foundation 
In 2002, Comhairle na nÓg was established by the City and County Development Boards in each of the 31 local authority areas, as part of the National Children's Strategy. The Department of Children and Youth Affairs (DYCA) established Comhairle na nÓg to give youth the chance to make changes in their regional areas.

2005 Review by the DYCA 
A review of Comhairle na nÓg, commissioned by the Office of the Minister for Children and Youth Affairs (OMCYA) noted that many of the 31 Comhairle na nÓg in Ireland were not effectively engaging with young people. A snippet of the report can be found below."practices across the country vary considerably both in the quality of Comhairle na nÓg events and programmes and the frequency whereby young people come together to give voice to their views and to make their views known"This resulted in the Comhairle na nÓg Implementation Group being founded in June 2006, to ensure the effective operation of Comhairle na nÓg.

Dáil na nÓg
The organisation convenes Dáil na nÓg, the National Youth Assembly, in Leinster house every year. Members represent Dáil constituencies at the plenary.

Annual General Meetings 
Every year, each of the Comhairle na nÓg holds an Annual General Meeting (AGM) in September or October. All young people are invited from local schools or youth groups. A Comhairle na nÓg committee will be elected at the AGM.

During the AGM, the young people pick the topics which are most important to them.

References

Youth organisations based in Ireland
Organizations established in 2002
2002 establishments in Ireland